William J. Ruane (October 24, 1925 – October 4, 2005) was an American businessman, investor, and philanthropist.

Ruane graduated from the University of Minnesota in 1945 with a degree in electrical engineering and from Harvard Business School in 1949. He enlisted in the U.S. Navy and was on his way to Japan when World War II ended. He met Warren Buffett at an investment seminar with value investing guru Benjamin Graham and he and Buffett became lifelong friends. When Buffett closed his investment group in 1969, he advised associates to consider investing with Ruane as they both employed Graham's value investing techniques.

Ruane founded his own investment firm, Ruane Cunniff, with partner Rick Cunniff in 1970, and the same year they launched their flagship Sequoia Fund. Ruane's firm was renamed Ruane, Cunniff, and Goldfarb in 2004, when Robert Goldfarb became president. In 2008, the Sequoia Fund announced it would open its fund to new investors for the first time since 1982.

In 1992 he adopted a block in the Harlem neighborhood of New York City, committed to make it a better place, renovating buildings and establishing clinics and community service programs. Ruane gave every child on the block a scholarship to a Catholic school. He also funded programs at public schools and schools on Indian reservations, and contributed to mental health causes.

Death
He died at Memorial Sloan-Kettering Cancer Center in Manhattan, aged 79 (several weeks before his 80th birthday) of lung cancer.

Personal life
William J. Ruane resided in Manhattan and Washington, Connecticut. He was married twice his first wife predeceased him his second wife to whom he was married at the time of his death was Joy. He had offspring his sons were William Jr., who lived in Cambridge, Massachusetts, and Thomas, of Washington, Connecticut.; his daughters were Elizabeth "Lili" Ruane, of Burlington, Vermont, and Paige Ruane, of New York City; he had a sibling, Patricia Lowry, of Kihei, Maui, Hawaii.

See also
Warren Buffett
David Dodd
Irving Kahn

References

External links
Obituary in The Washington Post 
Storied Sequoia Fund to reopen

1925 births
2005 deaths
American investors
American money managers
Philanthropists from Illinois
Businesspeople from Chicago
Deaths from lung cancer in New York (state)
Harvard Business School alumni
University of Minnesota College of Science and Engineering alumni
20th-century American businesspeople
20th-century American philanthropists